Sir Michael John Darrington (born 8 March 1942) is a British businessman.

Career

Educated at Lancing College in Sussex, Darrington later qualified as a chartered accountant and spent 17 years with United Biscuits from 1966–83, latterly in general management. 

During this time he attended the PMD course at Harvard Business School in 1974. He joined Greggs Bakery in 1983 and was appointed Managing Director in January 1984.

Personal life

He was awarded a knighthood in the 2004 New Year Honours in recognition of his services to business and to the community in the North East. 

He married Paula Setterington in 1965, and has two daughters and a son. Currently resides in Northumberland.

References
 Profile, Greggs.plc.uk. Accessed 6 January 2023.

 

Living people
1942 births
British food industry businesspeople
Businesspeople awarded knighthoods
Harvard Business School alumni
Knights Bachelor
People educated at Lancing College
Place of birth missing (living people)